Yves Bilodeau (born 7 February 1962) is a Canadian former cross-country skier who competed at the 1988 Winter Olympics, the 1992 Winter Olympics and the 1998 Winter Olympics.

References

1962 births
Living people
Canadian male cross-country skiers
Olympic cross-country skiers of Canada
Cross-country skiers at the 1988 Winter Olympics
Cross-country skiers at the 1992 Winter Olympics
Cross-country skiers at the 1998 Winter Olympics
Université Laval alumni